Augusta Amherst Austen (2 August 1827 – 5 August 1877) was a British organist and composer, chiefly of hymns.

Austen was born in London, and studied at the Royal Academy of Music. She was a church organist for most of her active career, from 1844 to 1848 at Ealing Church, and from 1848 to 1857 at Paddington Chapel. She composed various hymns, of which one, "St. Agnes", was published in Charles Steggall's Church Psalmody (1849).

She married Thomas Anstey Guthrie shortly after leaving Paddington Chapel. One of her sons, also named Thomas Anstey Guthrie, became a well-known novelist. She died in Glasgow.

See also
English women hymnwriters (18th to 19th-century)

 Eliza Sibbald Alderson
 Sarah Bache
 Charlotte Alington Barnard
 Sarah Doudney
 Charlotte Elliott
 Ada R. Habershon
 Katherine Hankey
 Frances Ridley Havergal
 Maria Grace Saffery
 Anne Steele
 Emily Taylor
 Emily H. Woodmansee

References
 
 

1827 births
1877 deaths
19th-century English musicians
19th-century British women musicians
19th-century British women writers
19th-century British writers
English organists
English composers
British women composers
English hymnwriters
Alumni of the Royal Academy of Music
Women organists
British women hymnwriters
19th-century organists